Inkerman is a civil parish in Gloucester County, New Brunswick, Canada.

For governance purposes it is divided between the towns of Caraquet, Hautes-Terres, and Shippagan, the Pokemouche 13 Indian reserve, the regional municipality of Tracadie; all are members of the Acadian Peninsula Regional Service Commission.

Prior to the 2023 governance reform, the parish was divided between Tracadie and the local service districts of Evangéline, Inkerman Centre, Landry Office, Maltempec, and Pokemouche.

The local service district of the same name, which included only part of the parish, was amalgamated into the Regional Municipality of Grand Tracadie–Sheila on July 1, 2014, causing some misunderstanding of its status.

Origin of name
The parish is named after the Battle of Inkerman in the Crimean War, fought in 1854.

History
Inkerman was erected in 1855 from Saumarez Parish.

In 1870 the boundary with Saumarez Parish was adjusted.

In 1881 the western part of Inkerman was included in the newly erected Saint-Isidore.

Boundaries
Inkerman Parish is bounded:

on the north by a line beginning at the northwestern corner of grant 255 on the western side of Lavigne Road, a bit south of the end of Chemin Gauvin est, easterly to a point on the prolongation of the rear line of the tier of grants on the eastern bank of the Pokemouche River, 300 chains (6.035 km) inland, then southeasterly along the grants to Grande Anse, then southeasterly and southwesterly along the shore to the mouth of the Pokemouche River;
on the east by the Gulf of Saint Lawrence
on the south by a line beginning at the Old Tracadie Gully, across Tracadie Bay, up LeBouthillier Brook to Route 11, then southwesterly along grant lines to the north line of grant 145 on the north side of Route 160 and along the grant to where it strikes the Saint-Isidore Parish line;
on the west by a line running northwesterly from Saint-Raymond Road, at the southeastern corner of grant 144 on the south side of Route 160, to the southern line of Range 6 in the Paquetville South Settlement, which runs along the south side of Val-Doucet Road farther west, then northeastern and northwesterly along Range 6 to the Pokemouche River; then northeasterly in a direct line to the southernmost corner of the tier of grants west of Lavigne Road, then northwest along the rear of four grants in the tier to the northern line of Inkerman.

Governance
The Regional Municipality of Tracadie includes the southern part of the parish, the boundary running generally along the rear lines of grants along the Pokemouche River, Cowans Creek, and the South Branch Pokemouche River below McConnell Brook; the barrier islands along the outer edge of Tracadie Bay are also part of the regional municipality. From east to west, the communities of Four Roads, Six Roads, Boudreau Road, Sainte-Rose-Gloucester, Gaspereau, and Haut-Sainte-Rose are within the regional municipality, as is the part of Pont-Landry within this parish.

In addition to basic LSD services, all LSDs assess for the voluntary services of street lighting and community & recreation services. Running east to west, the local service districts and Indian reserve are:

Inkerman Centre contained the peninsula east of the South Branch Pokemouche River, all of Inkerman Parish east from the junction of Nardini Road and Route 345, and all of Caraquet Parish south of the wetlands along Jules Brook. The community of Inkerman comprises the peninsula, Inkerman Ferry the area east of the Pokemouche River; the former community of Pokemouche Junction, centred around Nardini Road and Allée Connolly, has been absorbed by Inkerman Ferry. Established in 1970 to provide street lighting. Originally it included Four Roads as far west as Green Point Road but was otherwise much smaller than today; it expanded in 1987 on all sides, lost Évangéline in 1988, and lost Four Roads to Tracadie in 2015. Now part of Shippagan.

Evangéline (French Évangéline) included grants along Route 345 from the junction with Nardini Road west to the junction with Route 11, as well as a short stretch of Route 335. Established in 1988 from parts of Inkerman Centre and Pokemouche; the corresponding taxing authority was Évangeline. The name Waugh appears on the area cadastral map; the Waugh post office was renamed Evangeline in 1949. Now mostly part of Caraquet, with a small area in the southeastern border part of Shippagan.

Pokemouche straddles the Pokemouche River along Route 11; the southern portion comprises grants along the western side of the South Branch Pokemouche River north of McConnell Brook, along the Pokemouche between South Branch Portage River and Cowans Creek, and along Pokemouche Cross Road; the northern portion includes Pokemouche River grants west to the mouth of Whalens Brook and a strip of interior grants between the end of Basile Road and Route 350. The communities of Pokemouche and South River are in the southern portion, Upper Pokemouche in the northern; Walsh's Island is between the two. Established in 1987, when it included all of Evangéline west of Route 335. Now part of Shippagan.

Landry Office straddles the Pokemouche, with Landry Centre Road bridging the river. The southern portion includes all Pokemouche River grants from the mouth of Cowans Creek to the Indian reserve, grants along the western, northern, and southern sides of Cowans Creek, and a half-dozen interior grants in its southeastern corner; the Pokemouche Indian reserve separates  The northern portion contains Pokemouche River grants from Whalens Brook to the end of Landry Road and interior grants along Landry, Godin, and Haché Roads and the west side of Basile Road. A small area west of the Indian reserve is isolated from the rest of the LSD and lacks highway access. The communities of Cowans Creek and Landry are in the southern portion, Haché Road in the northern portion. Established in 1988, it originally ended near Gliddens Brook; Cowans Creek and the southeastern corner were added in 1989. Now mostly part of Caraquet, with the westernmost two grants now part of Tracadie.

Maltempec comprises all grants north of the Pokemouche River and west of the end of Landry Road. Its single community was originally spelt Maltampec. Established in 1987. Now part of Hautes-Terres.

The Pokemouche 13 Indian reserve is on the southern bank of the Pokemouche River, west of the end of Cowans Creek. The reserve belongs to the Esgenoopetitj First Nation and was originally much larger, stretching east to Nowlans Brook; there is no highway access.

The following former LSDs were all annexed by Tracadie in 2014.

The LSD of the parish of Inkerman was established in 1968, when it included the entire parish. By 1989 it was reduced to the community of Six Roads and western Four Roads.

Sainte-Rose was established in 1988, it was formed around the Ste. Rose Settlement, including the communities of Boudreau Road, Gaspereau, Haut-Sainte-Rose, and Sainte-Rose.

Pont Landry was established in 1986 and included the parish south of the Ste. Rose Settlement and grants along Route 355, and west of Carroll Road.

Communities
Communities at least partly within the parish; bold indicates an incorporated entity or Indian reserve; italics indicate a name no longer in official use

Cowans Creek
Évangéline
Haché Road
Inkerman
Inkerman Ferry
Pokemouche Junction
Landry
Maltampec
Pokemouche
Pokemouche 13
South River
Upper Pokemouche
Tracadie
Boudreau Road
Four Roads
Gaspereau
Haut-Sainte-Rose
Sainte-Rose-Gloucester
Six Roads

Bodies of water
Bodies of water at least partly in the parish:

Cowans Creek
Pokemouche River
Waugh River
Boudreau Channel
Pokemouche Bay
Pokemouche Gully
Lac à Finn
Inkerman Lake

Islands
Islands in the parish:
Polly Island
Walshs Island

Demographics
Parish population total does not include Regional Municipality of Tracadie or Pokemouche Indian reserve

Population

Language

See also
List of parishes in New Brunswick

Notes

References

Former parishes of New Brunswick
Neighbourhoods in New Brunswick